Man at Large is a 1941 American mystery film directed by Eugene Forde and written by John Larkin. The film stars Marjorie Weaver, George Reeves, Richard Derr, Steven Geray, Milton Parsons and Spencer Charters. The film was released on September 26, 1941, by 20th Century Fox.

Plot

Cast   
Marjorie Weaver as Dallas Davis
George Reeves as Bob Grayson
Richard Derr as Max
Steven Geray as Karl Botany
Milton Parsons as Mr. Sartoris
Spencer Charters as Mr. Gallon
Lucien Littlefield as Jones
Elisha Cook, Jr. as Hotel Clerk
Minerva Urecal as Mrs. Jones
Bodil Rosing as Klara
Richard Lane as Editor Grundy
Barbara Pepper as Myrtle
William Edmunds as Otto Kisling
George Cleveland as Sheriff Pickering 
Kurt Katch as Hans Brinker
Lenita Lane as Cataloni's Nurse-Receptionist
Ethel Griffies as Mrs. Zagra

References

External links 
 

1941 films
20th Century Fox films
American mystery films
1941 mystery films
Films directed by Eugene Forde
American black-and-white films
1940s English-language films
1940s American films